Baeocrara is a genus of featherwing beetles named because of the intricate structure of their flight wings, which have a long fringe of hairs on their borders.  They belong to the Ptiliidae family, and are minute: between 1 and 0.5 mm. They are mostly found in hollow fir stumps and other types of rotten wood, dung and plant detritus. They feed on fungal spores.  They seem to be recent immigrants to Northern Europe possibly introduced by the import of sawmill products. They have been reported in the Czech Republic.  They are one of the least known groups in the Coleoptera.

References

External links
 Baeocrara Clip Art

Ptiliidae
Staphyliniformia genera